Vintage Stock is a compilation album consisting of hit singles, b-sides and unreleased material recorded by Mary Wells during the R&B singer's tenure at Motown. It was released two years after she departed from the label.

Track listing

Side one
"The One Who Really Loves You"
"When I'm Gone" (later covered by Brenda Holloway)
"He's The One I Love" (later covered by Tammi Terrell)
"Two Lovers"
"Guarantee (For a Lifetime)"
"Honey Boy"

Side two
"My Guy"
"Everybody Needs Love" (later covered by The Velvelettes, Gladys Knight & the Pips, and Jimmy Ruffin)
"You Beat Me to the Punch"
"I'll Be Available" (later covered by Brenda Holloway)
"One Block from Heaven"
"Good-Bye and Good Luck"

Personnel
Lead vocals by Mary Wells
Background vocals by and The Rayber Voices, The Love Tones, The Temptations, The Supremes, Martha & the Vandellas, and The Andantes
Instrumentation by The Funk Brothers

References 

Mary Wells albums
Albums produced by Smokey Robinson
Albums produced by Norman Whitfield
1966 greatest hits albums
Motown compilation albums